Kira Radinsky (born July 28, 1986) is a Ukraine-born Israeli computer scientist, inventor and entrepreneur, specializing in predictive data mining.

She gained recognition after being selected by the MIT Technology Review to the "35 Innovators Under 35" list.  Her work was described in the popular press as  predicting the first in 130 years outbreak of cholera in Cuba, based on the pattern identified by mining of 150 years of data from various sources: in poor countries, floods within a year after a drought often follow by a cholera outbreak.

While working on her Ph.D. she co-founded a company, SalesPredict, based on similar ideas, but with different algorithms (the intellectual property of her work belongs to Technion). It was acquired by eBay in 2016, where Kira Radinsky worked as chief scientist and the director of data science during 2016–2019.

Since the end of 2021, Radinsky also serves as the Chief Executive Officer at Diagnostic Robotics, Tel Aviv, which she co-founded in 2019. She is also a visiting professor at Technion teaching the applications of predictive data mining in medicine. She has co-authored over 10 patents and more than 40 peer-reviewed articles.

Awards and recognition

 2016 selected as the "Woman of the Year" by Lady Globes  magazine.
2015 Included into the Forbes "30 under 30" young innovators and entrepreneurs list 
2013: Included into the MIT Technology Review's "35 Innovators Under 35" list

References

External links

Kira Radinsky personal website

1986 births
Living people
Israeli computer scientists
Israeli women computer scientists
Technion – Israel Institute of Technology alumni
Israel Defense Prize recipients
20th-century Israeli businesswomen
20th-century Israeli businesspeople
Ukrainian emigrants to Israel
Ukrainian Jews
Data miners